The 2016 Finnish Cup (Suomen Cup) is the 62nd season of the Finnish Cup. 125 clubs entered the competition.

Teams

First round
14 teams played in the first round.

Second round
80 teams played in the second round.

Third round
40 teams played in the third round.

Fourth round
52 teams played in the fourth round.

Fifth round
32 teams played in the Fifth round.

Sixth round
16 teams played in the sixth round.

Quarter-finals

Semi-finals

Final

Scorers

7 goals:
 Juho Patola - P-Iirot

6 goals:

 Alfredo Morelos - HJK
 Jussi Länsimaa - HJS Academy

5 goals:
 Michael Ibiyomi - AC Kajaani

4 goals:

 Aleksi Hollmen - EPS
 Mikko Jalonen - EPS
 Karim Jouini - Honka
 Didis Lutumba-Pitah - Honka Academy
 Jasin Abahassine - JJK
 Maales Lombo - Kiisto
 Robin Saastamoinen - Lahti Akatemia
 Petteri Heikkilä - Legirus Inter
 Pietari Palomäki - RiPS
 Aleksandr Kokko - RoPS
 Ariel Ngueukam - SJK

3 goals:

 Jesse Ketonen - Atletico Malmi
 Eero Forsen - Gnistan/Ogeli
 Topi Järvi - Haka
 Otto-Pekka Jurvainen - HIFK
 Anton Londono - Honka Academy
 Niklas Blomqvist - HooGee/2 / TPS
 Niko Ruotsalainen - Kasiysi Rocky
 Marko Hyvönen - Lahti Akatemia
 Nando Cózar - Legirus Inter
 Agustin Ojeda - Legirus Inter
 Samuel Chidi - Legirus Inter
 Mikko Ruokonen - LoPa
 Joni Murtomaa - NJS
 Julie Joakim - NuPS
 Lanne Ossian - NuPS
 Jari Koivulahti - NuPS
 Billy Ions - PS Kemi
 Roope Riski - SJK

2 goals:

 Ali Hajizadeh - AC Kajaani
 Haarala Jukka - Atletico Malmi
 Matias Pitkänen - Gnistan/Ogeli
 Marko Selin - Gnistan/Ogeli
 Joni Mäkelä - Haka
 Dudu Omagbemi - Haka
 Joni Kivelä - Harjun Potku
 Jonni Thusberg - Härmä
 Joni Korhonen - HIFK
 Ville Jalasto - HJK
 Mikael Forssell - HJK
 Juuso Huhtapelto - HJS Academy
 Onni Puhalainen - Honka Academy
 Toni Maarno - Honka Academy
 Rony Huhtala - Honka
 Antto Hilska - Ilves
 Solomon Duah - Inter Turku
 Benjamin Källman - Inter Turku
 Jukka Suhonen - JanPa
 Osku Partonen - JäPS
 Joni Norring - JäPS
 Juho Tuuliainen - JäPS
 Jussi Välilä - Jazz
 Waltteri Riihimäki - Jazz
 Nico Särkiniemi - JBK
 Joakim Häggblom - JBK
 Eetu Koistinen - JIPPO
 Elias Tolvanen - JIPPO
 Hans Ekroos - JoPS
 Aleksander Akbar - KäPa
 Markus Tukiainen - Kontu
 Jari Lappalainen - Korso United
 Eero Johansson - Korso United
 Kim Palosaari - KPV
 Isaac Inkilä - KUMU Edustus
 Saku Savolainen - KuPS
 Kalle Multanen - Lahti
 Jegor Pauk - Legirus Inter
 Zakaria Kibona - Legirus Inter
 Eino Kilpeläinen - NJS
 Viktor Limnell - NuPS
 Ilkka Pyyhtiä - NuPS
 Mikael Lundsten - NuPS
 Niklas Kuusio - P-Iirot
 Joonas Ojanen - P-Iirot
 Mikko Valtanen - P-Iirot
 Oso Syväoja - PEF
 Elmeri Oksanen - PEKA
 Tomi Räikkönen - Peltirumpu
 Lucas Kaufmann - PK-35 Vantaa
 Masar Ömer - PK-35 Vantaa
 Riku Eskolin - RiPS
 Levi Saikkonen - RiPS
 Jani Masalin - SC Wolves
 Jyri Brunou - SibboV
 Mikael Muurimäki - SJK-j Apollo
 Ali Koljonen - Tampere United
 Lauri Saari - Tampere United
 Mikko Viitajylhä - Tervarit-j/JuPa
 Samuli Leppänen - Töölön Vesa
 Oliver Reitala - ToTe
 Jani Tapani Virtanen - TPS

1 goals:

 Timo Heikkinen - AC Kajaani
 Edijs Joksts - AC Kajaani
 Jordi Lahnalakso - AC Kajaani
 Rezgar Amani - Åland
 Mikko Huupponen - Atletico Malmi
 Jonne Ketonen - Atletico Malmi
 Henri Mattsson - Atletico Malmi
 Akan Okomoh - Atletico Malmi
 Antti Säynätkari - Atletico Malmi
 Mika Tenkanen - Atletico Malmi
 Soran Enayati - Aztecas
 Pontus Lindroos - Boda
 Philip Enckell - CLE
 Juuso Palmroos - EPS
 Ali Barkat - EPS
 Matti Pirhonen - EsPa
 Pyry-Ville Korhonen - EsPa
 Modou Ngum - EsPa
 David Carlsson - GBK
 Joonas Tuomi - Gnistan/Ogeli
 Tuukka Laitinen - Gnistan/Ogeli
 Esko Häyrynen - Gnistan 2
 Rami Murto - Gnistan 2
 Cheyne Fowler - Haka
 Niilo Mäenpää - Haka
 Jere Intala - Haka
 Emenike Mbachu - Haka
 Jesse Ahonen - Haka
 Jaakko Rantanen - Haka
 Atte Ekholm - Härmä
 Juuso Lindroos - Härmä
 Tatu Mäkelä - Härmä
 Ersin Ramadani - Härmä
 Eero Peltonen - HIFK
 Ville Salmikivi - HIFK
 Jukka Aakko - HIFK/4
 Obed Malolo - HJK
 Leo Väisänen - HJK
 Saku Ylätupa - HJK
 Toni Kolehmainen - HJK
 Atomu Tanaka - HJK
 Markus Grönlund - HJK/Lsalo
 Jere Suomalainen - HJS Academy
 Filipe Mello - Honka
 Calvin N'Sombo - Honka
 Joel Perovuo - Honka
 Niki Otaru - Honka
 John Weckström - Honka
 Jean Carlo - Honka
 Jonne Innala - Honka Academy
 Aleksi Jokela - Honka Academy
 Konsta Karppinen - Honka Academy
 Sebastian Lindfors - Honka Academy
 Eero Hirvonen - Honka Academy
 Kasperi Nieminen - Honka Academy
 Adam Yassin - Honka Academy
 Simo Räsänen - Honka Academy
 Efe Pehlivan - Honka Academy
 Robert Lindfors - HooGee
 Mikael Huttunen - HooGee
 Tim Basili - HPS
 Joonas Lehtinen - I-HK
 Mikko Maaranen - I-HK
 Tony Tallqvist - I-HK
 Robin Sid - IFK Mariehamn
 Dever Orgill - IFK Mariehamn
 Aleksei Kangaskolkka - IFK Mariehamn
 Bobbie Friberg da Cruz - IFK Mariehamn
 Topias Järvelä - Ilves 2
 Jussi Nummela - Ilves 2
 Konsta Raittinen - Ilves 2
 Guy Gnabouyou - Inter Turku
 Juho Salminen - Inter Turku
 Felix Nykopp - HooGee
 Sergei Eremenko - Jaro
 Josue Soto - Jaro
 Alvarado Morín - Jaro
 Matias Koskinen - Jazz
 Juho Lehtonen - Jazz
 Aleksi Nurminen - Jazz
 Joni Remesaho - JBK
 Singh Sumit - JBK
 Kristoffer Knuts - JBK
 Viktor Strömbäck - JBK
 Tommi Miettinen - JFC
 Johannes Mononen - JIPPO
 Antti Kuosmanen - JIPPO
 Miika Vainikainen - JIPPO
 Teemu Hallikainen - JIPPO
 Topi Sormunen - JIPPO
 Joona Pussinen - JIPPO
 Aapo Makkonen - JIPPO
 Mikko Ala-Porkkunen - JJK
 Topias Tammelin - JJK
 Iiro Järvinen - JJK
 Matti Lähitie - JJK
 Mikko Manninen - JJK
 Toni Tahvanainen - JJK
 Joona Itkonen - JJK
 Niko Markkula - JJK
 Antto Tapaninen - JJK
 Samu Suoraniemi - JJK
 Jarno Ruisniemi - JoPS
 Tuomas Kortelainen - JoPS
 Jerome Ogbuefi - JS Hercules
 Arttu Haapala - JS Hercules
 Sampsa Mäkinen - KäPa
 Tommi Tainio - KäPa
 Antti Arvola - Kasiysi Rocky
 Jani Sundström - KelA
 Ahmadi Ruin - Kiisto
 Conny Nyman - Kiisto
 Mikko Joensuu - Kiisto
 Simo Miettinen - Kontu
 Teemu Ilola - Kontu
 Evgeni Tolppa - Kontu
 Arto Kuoremäki - Korso United
 Samuli Hopia - Korso United
 Riku Savolainen - Korso United
 Aleksi Hämäläinen - KPS
 Joni Kivinen - KPS
 Ville Luokkala - KPV
 Irakli Sirbiladze - KPV
 Henri Myntti - KPV
 Mike Banner - KPV
 Washilly Tshibasu - KPV
 Yankuba Ceesay - KPV
 Joonas Myllymäki - KPV
 Niko Ikävalko - KTP
 Milo Behm - KUMU Edustus
 Iisak Inkilä - KUMU Edustus
 Jere Mäkinen - KUMU Edustus
 Mikko Piirala - KUMU Edustus
 Tomi Räsänen - Kuopion Elo
 Pekka Pentikäinen - Kuopion Elo
 Patrik Alaharjula - KuPS
 Jani Mahanen - KuPS
 Azubuike Egwuekwe - KuPS
 Tuomas Rannankari - KuPS
 Juha Hakola - KuPS
 Gbolahan Salami - KuPS
 Aleksi Paananen - Lahti
 Mikko Hauhia - Lahti
 Drilon Shala - Lahti
 Jasse Tuominen - Lahti
 Mikko Kuningas - Lahti
 Santeri Hostikka - Lahti
 Fareed Sadat - Lahti
 Jens Tanskanen - Lahti Akatemia
 Burhan Sadik - Lahti Akatemia
 Onuray Köse - Lahti Akatemia
 Samuel Mahlamäki Camacho - Lahti Akatemia
 Mikael Salimäki - Lahti Akatemia
 Topias Hänninen - LPS
 Riku-Pekka Huhanantti - LPS
 Topi Rihtniemi - LPS
 Samuli Laitila - LPS
 Saman Safiyari - Legirus Inter
 Manel Subirats - Legirus Inter
 Mikko Halonen - Legirus Inter
 Santeri Harja - LoPa
 Miika Talvasto - LoPa
 Joonas Vuorela - LoPa
 Niko Vainionpää - MuSa
 Miika-Samuel Rostedt - MuSa
 Juuso Havia - MynPa
 Tom Termaat - MynPa
 Joonas Kivilä - MynPa
 Miikka Sainio - MynPa
 Šemsudin Mujkić - Närpes Kraft
 Jonas Granfors - Närpes Kraft
 Jossimar Sanchez - Närpes Kraft
 Joonas Järvenpää - NJS
 Nikke Jussila - NJS/2
 Pol Deng - OTP
 Josey Dziadulewicz - OTP
 Rony Knape - OTP
 Ville Vanhatalo - FC Pato
 Miika Pertola - P-Iirot
 Vasile Marchiș - P-Iirot
 Niko Ahola - PEF
 Mikko Hyötylä - PEF
 Salmio Salonico - Peimari UTD
 Juho Nykänen - PEKA
 Jani Liski - PEKA
 Arame Mudahemuka - PEKA
 Toni Raanti - PEKA
 Ferdi Balkiran - PEKA
 Jommi Pätäri - Pelikaani
 Marcus Heimonen - PK-35 Vantaa
 Mateo - PK-35 Vantaa
 Pablo Couñago - PK-35 Vantaa
 Yerai Couñago - PK-35 Vantaa
 Njazi Kuqi - PK-35 Vantaa
 Samuel Olander - PKKU
 Joona Kemppainen - PPJ
 Kimmo Koivisto - PPJ
 Saša Jovović - PS Kemi
 Hertell Valtteri - RiPS
 Joni Parjanen - RiPS
 Robert Taylor - RoPS
 Will John - RoPS
 Abdou Jammeh - RoPS
 Jean Fridolin Nganbe - RoPS
 Aapo Heikkilä - RoPS
 Riku Välikangas - Sääripotku
 Henry Söderlund - SIF
 Thomas Karv - SIF
 Matej Hradecky - SJK
 Matti Klinga - SJK
 Teemu Penninkangas - SJK
 Youness Rahimi - SJK
 Timo Tahvanainen - SJK
 Tuomas Nikupeteri - SJK-j Apollo
 Klaus Nevalainen - SC Riverball
 Eero Naakka - SC Riverball
 Joel Hilden - SC Wolves
 Jiri Vainio - SC Wolves
 Pavel Tiusanen - SUMU/Sob
 Soje Efe Bright - SUMU-77
 Tuomas Lehti - Tampere United
 Tuomas Alanen - Tampere United
 Lauri Lilleberg - Tervarit-j/JuPa
 Janne Komulainen - Tervarit-j/JuPa
 Jonni Rahko - Töölön Vesa
 Atte Malmström - Töölön Vesa
 Akseli Lehtonen - ToTe
 Ville Komu - ToTe
 Felix Lindfors - ToTe
 Riku Sjöroos - TPS
 Sami Rähmönen - TPS
 Ilari Mettälä - TPS
 Mikko Hyyrynen - TPS
 Timo Lekkermäki - TP-T
 Lari Hakanen - TP-T
 Niko Kiiveri - TPV
 Sergei Korsunov - TPV
 Paavo Näykki - TPV
 Jani Nygård - TuPS
 Markus Närhi - TuPS
 Joonas Vahtera - VPS
 Eero Tamminen - VPS
 Loorents Hertsi - VPS

Own goals:
 LehPa -77 (28 January 2016 vs Kuopion Elo)
 Jommi Pätäri Pelikaani (6 February 2016 vs Korso United)
 TuPS (28 January 2016 vs Legirus Inter)
 TuPS (28 January 2016 vs Legirus Inter)

References 

2016
Finnish Cup
Cup (2016)